Booky Wook 2: This Time It's Personal is the second memoir, written by English comedian and actor Russell Brand. It was published in September 2010 by HarperCollins.

Reception
A critic from  Entertainment Weekly gave the book an A minus saying fans of Brands first book will also like the sequel.

References

External links
 Booky Wook 2: This Time It's Personal press release

2010 non-fiction books
Books by Russell Brand
British memoirs
HarperCollins books
Show business memoirs